Bean Hollow State Beach is a beach in the state park system of California, United States. It is located in San Mateo County near Pescadero. The beach offers fishing, picnicking and beachcombing. Visitors can explore tide pools with anemones, crab, sea urchins and other marine inhabitants. The beach also has a self-guided nature trail. Swimming is dangerous because of cold water, rip currents, heavy surf and sharks. The  property was acquired by the state in 1958. Bean Hollow has become one of the premier locations in California for 1/10 scale radio control 4 wheel drive trucks.

Name
Named after Cañada del Frijol which was applied in the 1840s.  The English term was in use by 1861.

History
The earliest recording of the area was from the Portolá Expedition of 1769 who were retreating back to San Diego along an Ohlone road. "...we made camp close to one of two large streams in the San Pedro Regalado hollow, where there is a good-size lake, a great deal of wood, and grand grass." - Return Journal of Fray Juan Crespí, Saturday November 18. Once in Ohlone country, the Expedition found the native people to be most gracious, offering food and guidance. The Quiroste’s home territory encompassed roughly 90 square miles and stretched from the sea to ridge-tops in the mountains to the east. They were hunters and gatherers who knew how to manage their land’s resources so that the plants upon which they relied would proliferate. Quiriste Valley contains at least 13 documented and undocumented archaeological sites. Initial research shows they occupied the area at least a thousand years.

See also
List of California state parks
List of California State Beaches

References

External links 
 Bean Hollow State Beach

California State Beaches
Parks in San Mateo County, California
Protected areas established in 1958
San Francisco Bay Area beaches
1958 establishments in California
Beaches of San Mateo County, California
Beaches of Northern California